Henri Rivière was a French weightlifter. He competed in the men's featherweight event at the 1928 Summer Olympics.

References

External links
 

Year of birth missing
Possibly living people
French male weightlifters
Olympic weightlifters of France
Weightlifters at the 1928 Summer Olympics
Place of birth missing